Nikos Goumas Stadium was a multi-purpose stadium in Nea Filadelfeia, a northwestern suburb of Athens, Greece. It was used mostly for football matches and was the home stadium of AEK Athens F.C. It is now replaced by Agia Sophia Stadium built at the same site.

Name

The stadium was named "AEK Stadium" but was also known as "Nea Filadelfeia Stadium".

In 1991 it was officially named "Nikos Goumas Stadium" after former club president Nikos Goumas, who contributed to its building and later upgrading.

Construction

With actions of the first president of the club, Konstantinos Spanoudis, in 1926, a piece of land in Nea Filadelfeia, that was originally set aside for refugee housing, was donated as a training ground for the refugees. AEK Athens F.C. began using the ground as training ground (albeit unofficially) and by 1930 the property was signed over to the club.

The stadium was finished in 1929 and was officially opened in 1930 in a ceremony with the presence of Prime Minister Eleftherios Venizelos. The first home game, in November 1930, was an exhibition match against Olympiacos which ended in a 2–2 draw. The stadium had a horseshoe shape (with stands in three of its four sides.

Expansion

In 1979 chairman Loukas Barlos started building the double-tiered south stand, the addition of which made it the largest stadium in Athens at the time as its capacity was over 35,000 after the construction of this new stand. This stand, and particularly its lower tier known as "Skepasti" (meaning "roofed"), and became the new home of the AEK ultras who until then resided in the opposite "Gate 21" stand.

Renovation

In 1998, AEK Athens F.C. decided to install new seats, thereby reducing the stadium's capacity from 35,000 to 24,729 (not including the press and VIP stands).

Demolition

Giannis Granitsas, then president of AEK and temporarily chairman of AEK Athens F.C., decided to demolish the stadium in June 2003. He claimed that the stadium was too old and that seriously damaged from the 1999 Athens earthquake. The last game held was between AEK Athens and Aris. The game ended in a 4–0 win for AEK with Ilija Ivić scoring the last goal in the 77th minute.

Plans for new venue

The club's initial plan was to build a modern arena on the same site, complete with underground parking and an innovative underground basketball court. This ambitious plan was halted after various objections were raised by local residents.

After AEK Athens F.C. came under its current ownership, the plan for a stadium in Nea Filadelfeia was abandoned. Demis Nikolaidis started negotiations to build a new football stadium further to the north, on the southern foothills of Mount Parnitha. Nevertheless, this drew a great deal of controversy with Original 21 who opposed this plan.

The land of the former Nikos Goumas stadium is still owned by AEK and plans for building a new stadium in the Nikos Goumas area still exist.

On October 2, 2013, the AEK Athens board, under Dimitris Melissanidis, presented plans of the new stadium to the municipality of Nea Filadelfeia, in order to gain permission to build. A new  4 star UEFA system stadium will be built, seating between 32500 and 35000 spectators. The cost of this project has yet to be unveiled, but AEK has been granted 20 million euros by the government as a contribution to the stadium and the rest of the funding will be done privately. It is modelled after the Hagia Sophia church in Constantinople, as AEK has its roots there. Around 1000–1500 new jobs will become available and the neighbourhood is expected to benefit largely from this endeavour.

Record

Attendance Record

Concerts
Rory Gallagher performed at the stadium in 1981. Iron Maiden and Bryan Adams also had a performance at the stadium in 1988 and the group The Cure in 1989. In 1990 Tina Turner gave a concert in the stadium. In 1992 the group Simply Red and in 1993 Elton John and Sting performed at Nikos Goumas Stadium.
In the mid-80s David Hasselhoff entered and performed in the ground of the stadium along with KITT.

References

External links
AEK Athens Official Site
Stadium Information

Sports venues completed in 1930
Sports venues in Attica
Multi-purpose stadiums in Greece
Defunct football venues in Greece
1930 establishments in Greece
Sports venues demolished in 2003
2003 disestablishments in Greece